Aloys Jousten (2 November 1937 – 20 September 2021) was a bishop emeritus of the Diocese of Liège in Belgium.

Jousten was born in Sankt-Vith on 2 November 1937, and ordained priest in Liège on 8 July 1962. He held the degree of Doctor of Theology. He was nominated as the 91st Bishop of Liège on 9 May 2001, and was consecrated on 4 June the same year.

In 2009 he was named as a possible successor to Godfried Danneels as Archbishop of Mechelen-Brussels. He proffered his resignation as bishop of Liège in November 2012, having reached the age of 75, but agreed to remain as bishop until his successor was appointed. He retired on 31 May 2013.

References

External link

1937 births
2021 deaths
People from St. Vith
Bishops of Liège